Rochester Township is a township in Kingman County, Kansas, USA.  As of the 2000 census, its population was 210.

Geography
Rochester Township covers an area of 36.28 square miles (93.95 square kilometers); of this, 0.03 square miles (0.09 square kilometers) or 0.1 percent is water. The streams of Goose Creek and Kemp Creek run through this township.

Cities and towns
 Zenda

Adjacent townships
 Peters Township (north)
 Belmont Township (northeast)
 Chikaskia Township (east)
 Township No. 1, Harper County (south)
 Ridge Township, Barber County (southwest)
 Liberty Township (west)
 Kingman Township (northwest)

Cemeteries
The township contains three cemeteries: Nichols, Pleasant Hill and Saint Johns.

Major highways
 K-42 (Kansas highway)

References
 U.S. Board on Geographic Names (GNIS)
 United States Census Bureau cartographic boundary files

External links
 US-Counties.com
 City-Data.com

Townships in Kingman County, Kansas
Townships in Kansas